Richard Descoings (June 23, 1958 – April 3, 2012) was a French civil servant. He was serving as the Director of the Paris Institute of Political Studies (French: Institut d'études politiques de Paris or Sciences Po Paris), and as such as the Chief Administrator of the National Foundation of Political Science (Fondation nationale des sciences politiques, FNSP). These two entities are collectively referred to as Sciences Po (see Use of Sciences Po), and are two of the most prestigious public policy research and teaching bodies in Europe. Descoings was also a senior member of the Conseil d'État.

Early life
Descoings was born in Paris, where he graduated from the Institut d'études politiques (Sciences Po) in 1980, and subsequently studied at the École nationale d'administration from 1983 to 1985.

Career
From 1985 to 1989, he worked as an auditor in the legal section of the Conseil d'État and, in 1987, was appointed special advisor to Alain Lancelot, Director of the Institut d'études politiques de Paris.

In 1989 he was appointed Deputy Director of the Institut d’études politiques de Paris, and remained in that post until 1991 when he was appointed Counsel (conseiller d'État) of the Conseil d'État. From 1991 to 1993, he was successively technical advisor to the cabinet of the Minister for the Budget, with particular responsibility for monitoring the national education and higher education budget, and then special advisor to the Minister of National Education with responsibility for budgetary issues.

From 1993 to 1996 he was appointed Deputy General Reporter on the report and studies section of the Conseil d'État and on the task force on the responsibilities and organization of the State.  From 1995 to 1996, he worked as government commissioner for legal training at the Conseil d'État. He was appointed the chief figure at Sciences Po in 1996.

For his service to the French Republic, Descoings was awarded Knight of the Order of Merit and Knight of the Order of Academic Palms. He was also awarded Commander of the Brazilian Order of Rio Branco and an honorary doctorates from Waseda University, Japan.

Death
On April 3, 2012, he was found dead in a Manhattan luxury hotel room. The circumstances surrounding his premature death and his dissolute lifestyle have generated rumours in the media,   but  it was determined that he died a natural death of "causes related to hypertension."

He is buried at the cemetery of Pernes-les-Fontaines in southeastern France.

Bibliography 
Raphaëlle Bacqué, Richie, Paris, Grasset, 2015

References

External links
 Official weblog

1958 births
2012 deaths
Lycée Montaigne (Paris) alumni
Lycée Henri-IV alumni
Lycée Louis-le-Grand alumni
Sciences Po alumni
École nationale d'administration alumni
Civil servants from Paris
Members of the Conseil d'État (France)
Knights of the Ordre national du Mérite
French LGBT people